Pethia setnai is a species of cyprinid fish native to streams of the Western Ghats, India. It is an endemic fish and is most commonly found in flowing sections of hill streams and smaller rivers. It can reach a length of up to  TL. The species named after later Dr. Sam Bomansha Setna, who was the first Director of Fisheries of the erstwhile Bombay State.

This species of fish needs the water temperature 20–26 °C, pH of 6.0–7.5 and the Hardness 90–268 ppm.

It is an omnivore and most likely to be found eating worms, as well as insects, other small sized Invertebrate, plant material and organic detritus.

This fish is to be thought as a good potential as an aquarium fish if it was to be bred in large numbers but can't currently as it has restricted distribution and has been included in IUCN Red List as vulnerable. Mining operations, tourism activities, organic wastes and sewage are reported as major threats to this species.

References 

Pethia
Fish of India
Barbs (fish)
Fish described in 1992